Points of View is a long-running British television series broadcast on BBC One. It started in 1961 and features the letters of viewers offering praise, criticism and observations on BBC television programmes of recent weeks.

History
Points of View began in 1961 with Robert Robinson presenting viewers' letters to the BBC. It was originally designed as an occasional five-minute "filler" to plug gaps between shows. Kenneth Robinson (1925–1994) took over in 1965, though Robert Robinson returned in 1969 before the show was dropped in 1971. During the 1960s there was also a spin-off, Junior Points of View.

The show returned in 1979 after a hiatus of eight years, with the dry humour of Barry Took at the helm. Originally only being broadcast in the London area as a five-minute filler whilst other parts of England were broadcasting regional programming, by 1980 it was broadcast across the whole of the UK. Took left in 1986 and was replaced by guest presenters including Tony Robinson, Alan Titchmarsh and Chris Serle, until Anne Robinson took over as presenter in 1987. For many years during this period, the programme held a slot of 20:50 on Wednesday evenings. In 1997 Anne Robinson left the series to concentrate on Watchdog. Following another period with guest presenters, Carol Vorderman becomes the next regular presenter in April 1998 but is later replaced by Des Lynam in February 1999.

By October 1999, Points of View had moved to a Sunday early evening slot, being presented by Terry Wogan and now included emails in addition to letters and telephone calls. In the 2007 series, Points of View featured diverse films, such as students from Sussex University making a passionate plea for the BBC to keep the soap opera Neighbours, John Leivers interviewing Roly Keating (the controller of BBC Two) on the channel's direction, and Jill Parkinson asking why there aren't more people with disabilities featured in BBC programmes.

In April 2008, Jeremy Vine became the regular presenter of the series. From April 2013, production switched to BBC Northern Ireland. On the last show of the present series on 1 July 2018, Vine announced his retirement from the show. In order to refresh the series, which returned in the autumn, and allow more time for audience feedback the show no longer was presenter-led, instead being narrated by Tina Daheley; however the show returned to the presenter format, whilst retaining Daheley, in 2022. The 2021 series was narrated by Nicki Chapman, a stand-in for Daheley who was absent due to pregnancy.

Public perception
The show has been seen as representing a certain passive-aggressive aspect of British culture; Victoria Wood once said "When the Russians feel strongly about an issue they form a bloody revolution – the British write a strongly worded letter to Points of View". Although, much less common now, the show has over the decades featured many a letter beginning "Why, oh why, oh why..." and signed "Upset of Uxbridge" or "Disgusted of Tunbridge Wells", or something similar (these days, most, if not all, simply use their real names). Along the way the show has catered for those who wish to see particular parts of programmes again, featuring letters asking "Please, please, please could you show the clip where Vera Lynn sang to the troops on the 50th anniversary of D-Day last week", and the like.

The series has been criticised for featuring too much praise of the BBC and its programmes, and playing down criticism. This tendency has been sent up by many comedians over the years, including memorable skits in Monty Python's Flying Circus and Not the Nine O'Clock News. In the latter, positive letters said such things as "I think the (television licence) fee is far too low. I would willingly sell my house and all its contents to help the BBC."

Further criticism came from comedians Stephen Fry and Hugh Laurie in their sketch comedy show A Bit of Fry and Laurie. In a sketch where Fry had supposedly removed Laurie's brain, Laurie said that he was "off to write a letter to Points of View". In a later episode, a woman claims she has had two letters read out on Points of View, and that "they say if you get three, you're automatically sectioned under the Mental Health Act." The programme became (around 1994) the first BBC TV show to invite contributions by email, and at one point, its producer Bernard Newnham had the only Internet connection in BBC Television Centre.

Presenters

 Robert Robinson (1961–1965; 1969–1971)
 Kenneth Robinson (1965–1969)
 Barry Took (1979–1986)
 Anne Robinson (January 1987 – September 1997)
 Guest presenters (September 1997 – March 1998)
 Carol Vorderman (April – August 1998)
 Des Lynam (February – May 1999)
 Terry Wogan (October 1999 – September 2007)
 Jeremy Vine (April 2008 – July 2018)
 Tina Daheley (September 2018–present)
 Nicki Chapman (April – October 2021, stand-in)

Timeline

Junior Points of View
Between 1963 and 1970, Robert Robinson (later replaced by Sarah Ward, and Gaynor Morgan Rees) presented a version designed for children's letters entitled Junior Points of View.

Theme
The original theme tune to the programme was the first 13 seconds of Kid Ory's trad jazz piece "Yaaka Hula Hickey Dula", played by the Dutch Swing College Band. When the series returned in 1979 a new piece called "Northern soul" was used before switching in 1982 to adopted the Beatles' "When I'm Sixty-Four" as its theme tune (because of the lyric "Send me a postcard, drop me a line, stating point of view"). This was dropped by the early 90s.

In the early 2000's, a bespoke acapella theme tune, entitled "Blah Blah" or "Blah Boopity Baya" was introduced, alongside a new title sequence featuring members of the public talking to a screen showing BBC programmes, set against a black background with streaks of light flying past. The composers and performers involved in the creation of this theme tune are unknown. In 2009, the theme gained notoriety when it was featured on BBC Radio 6 Music's Adam and Joe radio show, with the presenters mocking the theme tune's upbeat sound compared to the overall serious tone of Points of View at the time (then presented by Jeremy Vine; though the show became more light-hearted across Vine's overall run as presenter), adding that "the BBC's been in some quite serious trouble of late, so this is just a suggestion to our colleagues at the castle [BBC Television Centre]... you might want to change that music".

In 2011, an alternative mix of the previous theme came into use, with the acapella vocals being swapped for a synthesizer and background strings.

See also
 Feedback, the listener response programme for BBC radio networks
 Newswatch, a viewer response programme focused on BBC News
 Right to Reply, a viewer response programme previously broadcast by Channel 4
 Open Air, another viewer response programme broadcast live on BBC One
 Mailbag, a viewer response programme broadcast on RTÉ One in Ireland

References

External links

1961 British television series debuts
1960s British television series
1970s British television series
1980s British television series
1990s British television series
2000s British television series
2010s British television series
2020s British television series
BBC Birmingham productions
BBC Television shows
Criticism of journalism
English-language television shows
Television series about the media